Jawahar Navodaya Vidyalaya, South Garo Hills or locally known as JNV Baghmara is a boarding, co-educational  school in South Garo Hills district of Meghalaya state in India. Navodaya Vidyalayas are funded by the Indian Ministry of Human Resources Development and administered  by Navodaya Vidyalaya Smiti, an autonomous body under the ministry.

History 
The school was established in 1986, and is a part of Jawahar Navodaya Vidyalaya schools. This school is administered and monitored by Shillong regional office of Navodaya Vidyalaya Smiti. When established, this school was part of West Garo Hills district and after bifurcation of the district in June 1992, the school is part of South Garo Hills district.

Admission 
Admission to JNV Baghmara at class VI level is made through selection test conducted by Navodaya Vidyalaya Smiti. The information about test is disseminated and advertised in district by the office of South Garo Hills district magistrate (Collector), who is also chairperson of Vidyalya Management Committee.

Affiliations 
JNV Baghmara is affiliated to Central Board of Secondary Education with affiliation number 1340003.

See also 

 List of JNV schools

References

External links 

 Official Website of JNV South Garo Hills

High schools and secondary schools in Meghalaya
South Garo Hills
Educational institutions established in 1986
1986 establishments in Meghalaya